This is the discography documenting albums and singles released by American R&B/soul vocal group The Dells.

Albums

Studio albums

 The Second Time was re-released by Urgent! Records on June 13, 1991.

Compilation albums

Singles

Appearances
With Bunky Green
The Latinization of Bunky Green (Cadet, 1966)

References

Rhythm and blues discographies
Discographies of American artists
Soul music discographies